Susan Kathleen Milliken  (born 1940) is an Australian film producer and author.

Career
Milliken has made a number of films with director Bruce Beresford.
 
She chaired the Australian Film Commission from 1994 to 1997.

Honours and awards
Milliken was made an Officer of the Order of Australia (AO) in the 2008 Australia Day Honours for "service to the film and television industry through a range of organisations, as an advocate for the development of the industry, for support and encouragement of Indigenous film makers, and as a producer".

In 2018, Milliken won the Chauvel Award, which acknowledges significant contribution to the Australian screen industry.

Works

Films 
The Odd Angry Shot (1979) – producer
The Fringe Dwellers (1985) – producer
Les Patterson Saves the World (1987) – producer
Black Robe (1991) – producer
Sirens (1994) – producer
Dating the Enemy (1995) – producer
Paradise Road (1997) – producer
Crocodile Dreaming (2007) – producer
The Redfern Story (2013) – producer
Ladies in Black (2018) — producer and co-screenwriter

Books 

 Selective Memory; Melbourne, Vic. : Hybrid Publishers, 2013. 
 There’s a Fax From Bruce; Strawberry Hills, NSW : Currency Press Pty Ltd, 2016.

References

External links
 
 
 

1940 births
Living people
Australian film producers
Officers of the Order of Australia